Patrice Tonga (born September 2, 1975) is a retired Cameroonian  professional footballer, who played the majority of his career in Russia, gaining Russian citizenship in the process.

Career

Club
Tonga played youth football for his local club Dynamo Douala, before moving to Unisport FC where he won the Cameroonian Premier League in 1996. Tong moved back to Dynamo Douala in 1997 before moving to Krasnodar in Russia to study at the University of Physical Culture. After being recommended to FC Kolomna by one of his teachers, who were holding a pre-season camp in Krasnodar, Tonga signed with the team. Tonga spent a year with FC Kolomna before moving onto Sibiryak Bratsk. Due to a ban on foreign players playing in the Russian Second Division, Tonga missed the entire 2000 season. Jerry-Christian Tchuissé, with whom Tonga lived with as a student in Krasnodar, invited Tonga to play in an Inter-University Championship for Cameroon, which they won. In 2001, FC Kuban Krasnodar manager Oleg Dolmatov invited to Tonga for a trial, which lead to a permanent contract with the club. Tonga scored his only goal for Kuban in a match against Spartak Nalchik in 2002. Tonga left Kuban midway through the 2004 season, signing for Neftekhimik Nizhnekamsk before moving to Dynamo Makhachkala in 2005 where he finished his professional career in 2006.

International
Tonga claimed that he was a part of Cameroon U-20 at the 1995 FIFA World Youth Championship in Qatar.

Career statistics

Club

Honours
Unisport
Cameroonian Premier League (1): 1996

References

External links
 

1975 births
Living people
Cameroonian footballers
Cameroonian expatriate footballers
Expatriate footballers in Russia
Cameroonian expatriate sportspeople in Russia
FC Kuban Krasnodar players
Association football defenders
FC Neftekhimik Nizhnekamsk players
FC Dynamo Makhachkala players